Mammillaria berkiana is a species of cactus in the family Cactaceae. It is endemic to Mexico. Its natural habitat is hot deserts and is a cliff-dwelling species that grows among rocks on hillsides at an altitude from 1.800m to 2.400m.

It was discovered by Alfred B. Lau on April 18, 1980. It is considered in danger of extinction, as its number has fallen from 5000 in 1994 to less than 100 in 1999 in an area of only 1km².  It blooms purple flowers from autumn to spring and the flowers usually stay open for 5 to 6 days.

References

berkiana
Cacti of Mexico
Endemic flora of Mexico
Critically endangered plants
Taxonomy articles created by Polbot